Selby is a town in Yorkshire, England.

Selby may also refer to:

Placenames

Australia
 Selby, Victoria, an outer eastern suburb of Melbourne, Victoria

Canada 
 Selby, Ontario

South Africa 
 Selby, Johannesburg, a suburb of Johannesburg, South Africa

United Kingdom 
 Selby (district), a local government district of North Yorkshire
 Selby (UK Parliament constituency), a constituency represented in the House of Commons of the Parliament of the United Kingdom

United States 
 Selby, California, an unincorporated village in Contra Costa County
 Selby, South Dakota
 Selby Township, Bureau County, Illinois
 Selby-on-the-Bay, Maryland

People

Given name
Selby Ash (1836-1870), English cricketer
Selby Baqwa, Public Protector of South Africa from 1995 to 2002
Selby Beeler, female American author
Selby Burt (1903–1959), Australian cricketer
Selby Clewer (1917–2001), English architect
Selby Munsie (1870–1938), Australian politician 
Selby Mvusi (1929-1967), South African artist
Selby Norton (1836–1906), English doctor
Selby Whittingham (born 1941), Malaysian art expert based in London

Surname
Selby family, a family that originated in Selby, Yorkshire
Andrew Selby (born 1988), Welsh amateur boxer
Bill Selby (born 1970), American baseball player
Brit Selby (born 1945), Canadian ice hockey player
Charles Selby (c. 1802 – 1863), English actor and playwright
Charles August Selby (1755–1823), English-Danish merchant and landowner
Dale Pierre Selby (1953–1987), executed American murderer
David Selby (born 1941), American character and stage actor
David Selby (basketball) (born 1965), Australian wheelchair basketball player
Daryl Selby (born 1982), English professional squash player 
Erin Selby, Canadian politician and TV personality
Geoff Selby (1965–1989), Australian rugby league footballer
George Selby (1557–1625), English politician
Guy W. Selby (1871–1968), Michigan politician
Harry Selby (1913–1984), Scottish politician
Harry Selby (hunter) (1925–2018), South African big-game hunter
Hubert Selby Jr. (1928–2004), American writer
Isaac Selby (1859–1956), Australian lecturer, historian and anti-Catholic campaigner
Jennifer Selby, Canadian religious studies scholar
John Selby (disambiguation), several people
Josh Selby (born 1991), American basketball player
Kathryn Selby (born 1962), Australian classical pianist
Lauren Selby (born 1984), English professional squash player
Lee Selby (born 1987), Welsh professional boxer
Mark Selby (born 1983), professional snooker player
Mark Selby (musician) (1960/1961–2017), American blues rock singer-songwriter, guitarist, multi-instrumentalist and producer
Nicholas Selby (1925–2010), British television and theatre actor
Peter Selby (born 1941), Church of England Bishop of Worcester
Prideaux Selby (1747–1813), English soldier and political figure in Upper Canada
Prideaux John Selby (1788–1867), English ornithologist, botanist and artist and landowner
Rob Selby (born 1967), former professional American football player
Robert of Selby (died 1152), Englishman, courtier of Roger II of Sicily and chancellor of the Kingdom of Sicily
 Sidney Selby (1931–2020), American singer and musician known professionally as Guitar Crusher
 Sidney Selby III (born 1997), American rapper known professionally as Desiigner
Thomas Selby (disambiguation), several people
Tiffany Selby (born 1981), model, Playboy Playmate
Todd Selby, American photographer, blogger and fashion celebrity
Tony Selby (born 1938), English actor
Vera Selby
 Sir Walford Selby (1881–1965), British civil servant and diplomat
William Selby (disambiguation)

Titles
 Selby baronets
 Selby-Bigge baronets
 Viscount Selby

Fiction
 Selby (comics), a mutant character in the Marvel Comics Universe
 De Selby, fictional philosopher
 Doug Selby, fictional creation of Erle Stanley Gardner
 Jay Selby, a recurring character played by Tommy Hinkley in the first season of the sitcom Mad About You
 Selby the Talking Dog
 Selby (novel series), novel series by Duncan Ball featuring Selby the Talking Dog

See also 
 
 
 Shelby (disambiguation)